Isabell Palm (born 13 October 1995) is a Swedish ice hockey player with Linköping HC Dam of the Swedish Women's Hockey League (SDHL) and the Swedish national team. Known for her physical style of play, she holds both the single-season and all-time records for penalty minutes in the SDHL, being the first player to reach 400 career PIM.

Career  
Palm grew up in the Clemensnäs district of Skellefteå, in northern Sweden. She played on boys' teams until she turned 15, when she signed with Modo Hockey in Riksserien. She won the Riksserien championship with the club in her rookie season.

In 2017, she left Modo to sign with HV71. She passed Emma Eliasson to become the most penalised player in league history in the 2017-18 season. She received a 4-game suspension in January 2018 for a hit to the head in a match against Luleå HF/MSSK.

After two years with HV71, she signed with Linköping HC.

International 
She represented Sweden at the 2019 IIHF Women's World Championship.

References

External links

1995 births
Living people
People from Skellefteå Municipality
Swedish women's ice hockey forwards
HV71 Dam players
Modo Hockey Dam players
Linköping HC Dam players
Sportspeople from Västerbotten County